The Life of the Egyptians Party, or Egyptians Life Party is a political party started by former MP Mohamed Abu Hamed.

References 

Political parties in Egypt
Political parties with year of establishment missing